Lauititi Lui (born ) is a Samoan male weightlifter, competing in the +105 kg category and representing Samoa at international competitions. He participated at the 2014 Commonwealth Games in the +105 kg event. He won the silver medal at the 2015 Pacific Games, lifting a total of 362 kg and the bronze medal at the 2016 Oceania Weightlifting Championships, lifting a total of 368 kg.  He won the bronze medal at the 2013 Pacific Mini Games.

Major competitions

See also
 Weightlifting at the 2018 Commonwealth Games – Men's +105 kg

References

External links
 
 OlyStats.com
 Australian Olympic Committee
 Weightlifting: Men's +105kg results
 Commonwealth Weightlifting.com 
 IWF.net 

1995 births
Living people
Samoan male weightlifters
Place of birth missing (living people)
Weightlifters at the 2014 Commonwealth Games
Weightlifters at the 2018 Commonwealth Games
Commonwealth Games medallists in weightlifting
Commonwealth Games silver medallists for Samoa
20th-century Samoan people
21st-century Samoan people
Medallists at the 2018 Commonwealth Games